Alban Jude Lynch   (15 August 1930  - 17 September 2021) was a mining engineer and academic who helped develop the mineral processing teaching experience for mining students in Australia.

Early life 
Alban Lynch was born in Queensland in 1930. He attended the Christian Brothers College, St Patricks, Strathfield. He worked as an industrial chemist between 1947 and 1953 while studying his Diploma of Chemical Engineering part time through the Sydney Technical College.

Career 
After completing his diploma Lynch worked as a metallurgist with the Zinc Corporation of Broken Hill from 1954 to 1958. Here he worked with Maurice Mawby. He studied a BSc externally from the University of New South Wales graduating in 1956. He took his PhD from the University of Queensland in 1965 and a DSc from the University of New South Wales in 1975.

Lynch joined the staff of the University of Queensland’s Department of Mining and Metallurgical Engineering as a Research Officer in 1958. He began work on an Australian Mineral Industries Research Association (AMIRA) project on grinding in 1962. He worked with Jim May, who was CEO of AMIRA for a number of decades from the late 1960s. This was conducted at Mount Isa Mines (MIM) using circuits in its old concentrator to conduct their experiments. James Foots, the General Manager of Mount Isa Mines supported the project during this time. This project continues at the Julius Kruttschnitt Mineral Research Centre (JKMRC) and other universities.

Establishment of the JKMRC 
In 1971, Mount Isa Mines established the Julius Kruttschnitt Mineral Research Centre at the site of the former Indooroopilly Silver Mine in Brisbane, Queensland owned by the University of Queensland. Lynch was founding director and continued in the role until 1989. He pioneered the early use of computers to produce comminution and classification models which used operational plant data. This enabled simulation modelling of crushers, grinding mills, hydrocyclones and flotation. He pursued field blasting research, which has improved practice and measurement internationally. His network of industry and academic colleagues led to fieldwork opportunities for students and he supervised over 30 doctoral students during his time as director.

Lynch was Head of Mining and Metallurgical Engineering at the University from 1988 until his retirement in 1993. He continued to lecture on modelling and establishing research programmes in countries such as Malaysia, Brazil, Mexico and Turkey.

He has published a number of books and written over 150 technical publications.

Personal life 
Lynch married Barbara, who was from Broken Hill, in 1955 and had 7 children. The eldest 2 were born in Broken Hill and the following 5 in Brisbane.

Books 

 Mineral Crushing and Grinding Circuits (1977)
 Mineral and Coal Flotation Circuits (1980) with N.W. Johnson, E.V. Manlapig and C.G. Thorne
 Optimising fragmentation for overburden removal in strip mining (1984)
 The History of Grinding (2005) with Chester Rowland
 The History of Flotation (2010) with Greg Harbort and Mike Nelson
 Comminution Handbook (2015)

Awards and memberships 

 1978 President’s Award from the Australasian Institute of Mining and Metallurgy (AusIMM)
 1985 Richards Award from the American Institute of Mining, Metallurgical and Petroleum Engineers
 1989 AusIMM Distinguished Speaker Exchange Program
 1991 AusIMM Sir Willis Connolly Medal
 1993 Institute Medal from the AusIMM
 1999 Officer of the Order of Australia (AO) “for service to the mining industry, particularly in the area of research and education"
 2000 AM Gaudin Award from the Society for Mining, Metallurgy and Exploration, “for his many contributions to the simulation and control of comminution and flotation circuits.”
 2004, Honorary Fellowship from the Australasian Institute of Mining and Metallurgy (HonFAusIMM) “in recognition of his outstanding contribution to the minerals Industry over many years which has previously been recognised through 50 years membership in 2004.”
 1989, President, AusIMM
 2010, Lifetime Achievement Award of the International Mineral Processing Congress
 2013, International Mining Hall of Fame induction

References 

1930 births
2021 deaths
Australian mining engineers
People from Queensland
University of New South Wales alumni
University of Queensland alumni
Officers of the Order of Australia